The 2017–18 season was Al-Faisaly's 8th consecutive season in Pro League, the top flight of Saudi Arabian football, and their 64th year in existence. Along with the Pro League, the club also competed in the Crown Prince Cup and the King Cup.

The season covered the period from 1 July 2017 to 30 June 2018.

Players

Squad information

Transfers

In

Loans in

Out

Loans out

Pre-season friendlies

Competitions

Pro League

League table

Results summary

Results by round

Matches
All times are local, AST (UTC+3).

Crown Prince Cup

All times are local, AST (UTC+3).

King Cup

All times are local, AST (UTC+3).

Zayed Champions Cup

Statistics

Squad statistics
As of 24 May 2018.

|-
!colspan="14"|Players who left during the season

|}

Goalscorers

Last Updated: 24 May 2018

Clean sheets

Last Updated: 30 March 2018

References

Al-Faisaly FC seasons
Faisaly